Oceanic Feeling is The Prayer Boat's first full-length album, released in 1991 on BMG/RCA records.

The term "oceanic feeling" is a psychoanalytic term for the spiritual feeling of limitlessness.

Track listing

"Stopping The World" – 3:43
"Oceanic Feeling" – 5:03
"Millionaire Hero" – 4:00
"Don't Make Me Breathe You In" – 3:17
"Love and Possession" – 5:44
"Upside Down" – 3:18
"Out of Mind" – 5:36
"Still Only One" – 4:18
"Hunger For The Beautiful" – 6:36
"Mercy" – 10:36
"Among Madmen" – 4:19

External links
Emmett Tinley
The Prayer Boat

1991 albums